Mikhail Ivanovich Zalomin (born 22 December 1992 in Sarov, Nizhny Novgorod Oblast) is a Russian male trampoline gymnast. He is a 11-time World Champion, 6-time European Champion and a 6-time Russian national champion.

Career 
Zalomin began competing in trampoline in 2003 at a junior level. He won his first world medal, the bronze, in the 11/12-year-old boys age group, in double mini trampoline at the 16th Trampoline World Age Group Games in Hannover, Germany in October 2003. His first coach in Sarov was Alexander Zamotayev.

In 2009 Zalomin moved to Moscow, to study at the Moscow Secondary Special School of Olympic Reserve No. 1, where he was coached by V.I. Lukyanov.

Zalomin won his first senior world gold medal, in double mini trampoline, at the 2013 Trampoline World Championships in Sofia. He won his most recent world gold mendal, also in double mini trampoline, at the 2019 Trampoline Gymnastics World Championships in Tokyo.

Zalomin is the current President of the Moscow Sports Trampoline Federation.

He holds the title of a Meritorious Master of Sports of Russia.

Zalomin holds bachelor's and master's degrees from the Moscow City Pedagogical University.

References

External links 

Mikhail Zalomin at www.gymnastics.sport
Mikhail Zalomin at TheSports.org

1992 births
Living people
Russian male trampolinists
Medalists at the Trampoline Gymnastics World Championships
People from Sarov
Sportspeople from Nizhny Novgorod Oblast
21st-century Russian people